Crossways may refer to:

Places

Places
 Crossways, Dorset, England
 The Crossways, a 1908 historic two-storey house in Sydney, Australia

Structures
 Crossways (Aiken, South Carolina), listed on the U.S. National Register of Historic Places
 The Crossways, Toronto, a residential and commercial complex

Art, entertainment, and media
 Crossways (Deathlands novel)

See also
Crossway (disambiguation)